Olita Rause (born November 21, 1962) is a Latvian chess player who holds the FIDE titles of Woman Grandmaster (WGM, 1993) and International Master (IM, 1995). She also holds the ICCF title of Correspondence Grandmaster (GM, 1998).

Chess career
Rause won the silver medal in Latvian Chess Championship for women three times: 1981 (tournament won by Astra Goldmane), 1984 (tournament won by  Anda Šafranska), 1994 (after she lost additional match against Anda Šafranska - 1½:2½). In 1986, Rause played for Latvia in Soviet Women's Team Chess Championship in Minsk at second board.

Rause played for Latvia in Chess Olympiads:
 In 1994, at second board in the 31st Chess Olympiad in Moscow (+4, -4, =3).
Rause is one of strongest world's correspondence chess players. She won the ICCF World Cup VI tournament.

Personal life
Rause graduated from the University of Latvia with a Master of Philology degree. From December 2001 to February 2017 she worked as the editor in chief for Janis Roze Publishers in Riga. Rause was married to Igors Rausis.

References

External links
 
 
 
 
 
 Olita Rause player profile at Latvian Correspondence Chess Federation

1962 births
Living people
Latvian female chess players
Soviet female chess players
Sportspeople from Riga
University of Latvia alumni
Chess woman grandmasters
Chess International Masters